Sikharam is a Telugu daily serial that is telecasted in ETV Telugu daily at 6.30 pm to 7.00 pm IST

Description

Story about an idealistic Young man Eshwar Chandra Prasad Nagendra Babu who dreams of developing his village through educating the people present in the village.

Crew
 Director: Anwar
 Cinematographer: Shankar
 Editor:- Nagaraju
 Music:- Khuddus
 Producer:- Prasad Devineni
 Production:- Arka Media Works

References 
Shikaram Online, 12 March 2012

Telugu Flame, 14 June 2012

Online Telugu, 15 July 2012

Telugu Serials, 29 July 2012

Wikipedia, June 27, 2013

Indian television soap operas
2012 Indian television series debuts